The Al-Firdaus Mosque is a mosque in Choa Chu Kang, Singapore. This old generation mosque located in the West, at Jalan Ibadat, off Old Choa Chu Kang Road, was built in 1962. In 1999, the mosque, which serves the needs of the nearby residents, was rebuilt. Today, it can accommodate up to 200 people. There are religious classes for adults in the evening.

Transportation
The mosque is accessible from Choa Chu Kang MRT/LRT station.

See also
 Islam in Singapore
 List of mosques in Singapore

References

1962 establishments in Singapore
Choa Chu Kang
Firdaus
Mosques completed in 1962
20th-century architecture in Singapore